Christmas Symphony  may refer to:

Symphony No. 49 (Hovhaness)
Symphony No. 2 (Penderecki)
 "The Christmas Symphony" (Phil Perry, Joe Candullo, Charles Reade, published 1950), a song recorded by Perry Como in 1950
 Christmas Symphony (Mannheim Steamroller album)